Kabhie Kabhie is an anthology television series that premiered on 9 October 2003 on Zee TV, featuring small stories.

Episodes
The list of some of the episodes [short stories] that aired under Kabhie Kabhie:

Other episodes
Ankahi
Devdasi
Grahan
Jagruti
Khwaish
Rishta
Swarag-Narak
Pal Pal dilke paas
Uttar Dakshin

References

External links
 Kabhie Kabhie News Article on Indiantelevision.com
 Another News Article

Zee TV original programming
Indian anthology television series
2003 Indian television series debuts
2004 Indian television series endings